The Price/Wheeler House is a historic house located at 618 South 7th Street in Springfield, Illinois. Built in 1899, the house was the first of the city's turn-of-the-century Classical Revival residences. The house features a two-story front portico with four Ionic columns and a frieze and dentillated cornice. At the time of its construction, the house's design was unprecedented in Springfield; by 1910, however, the Classical Revival style was well-represented in Springfield's residential architecture. The house was built for Isaiah Price, a businessman who died two years after its construction. Former Springfield mayor and eventual U.S. Representative Loren Wheeler purchased the house in 1904.

The house was added to the National Register of Historic Places on February 14, 1985.

References

Houses on the National Register of Historic Places in Illinois
Neoclassical architecture in Illinois
Houses completed in 1899
National Register of Historic Places in Springfield, Illinois
Houses in Springfield, Illinois